Jackie Long (born October 23, 1981) is an American television and film actor, writer, musician, director and producer. He is also a voice actor for Grand Theft Auto V.

Filmography

Film

Television

Video games

External links

1981 births
Living people
American male film actors
American male television actors
African-American male actors
Male actors from Pasadena, California
21st-century African-American people
20th-century African-American people